This is a list of notable tango singers, that is, notable singers who are accomplished in the tango genre. Many tango musicians have been both musicians and singers, but this does not exclude from this list. While the vast majority of earlier tango singers were Argentines, this list illustrates the diversification of tango over time, with the growth in female stars such as Susana Rinaldi and the spread of tango around the world, as far as Russia (Pyotr Leshchenko), Poland (Jerzy Petersburski), and Turkey (İbrahim Özgür).

A
Jorge Abril Chile.
Alberto Acuña  (1896–1975) from Buenos Aires, formed a famous duo with René Ruiz and was also a guitar player and composer.
Carlos Acuña   (1915–1999) known for his deep, high and expressive voice. His foreign travels brought him success in Uruguay, Mexico, Italy and Spain, where he became a close friend of the exiled Juan Perón.
Eduardo Adrián (1923–1989) from Mar del Plata, also a writer, lecturer and theater director.		
Carlos Almada		
Oscar Alonso
Alberto Amor
Francisco Amor		
Alberto Arenas 	
Imperio Argentina		
Ernesto Ariel		
Roberto Arrieta 
Daniel Aste		
Carmelita Aubert		
Mariana Avena		
Roberto Ayala

B

Amelita Baltar
Lito Bayardo
Alfredo Belusi 
Carlos Bermudez 
Carlos Bernal
Elba Berón		
Raúl Berón 
José Betinotti
Beba Bidart
Eladia Blázquez
Armando Bonasco Chile.
Sofía Bozán		
Mario Bustos

C

Roberto Caló
Aldo Campoamor		
Enrique Campos 
Enrique Carbel
Luis Cardei		
Ángel Cárdenas		
Mercedes Carné
Carlos Casado		
Jorge Casal 
Horacio Casares		
Alberto Castillo 		
Roberto Chanel 
 
Juan Carlos Cobos
Alberto Cosentino
Pascual Contursi
Guillermo Coral
Abel Córdoba		
Luis Correa		
Ignacio Corsini 
Carlos Cristal

D

Alfredo Dalton		
Carlos Dante 
Héctor Darío 	
Dorita Davis 
Elvira De Grey's		
María de la Fuente 
Héctor De Rosas 
Hugo del Carril 
Olga Delgrossi		
Carmen Del Moral		
Alfredo Del Río 
Soledad del Valle		
María José Demare	
Horacio Deval		
Santiago Devin 
Ángel Díaz (singer) 
Fernando Díaz 
Luis Díaz 
Patrocinio Díaz 
Roberto Díaz 
Enrique Dumas
Carmen Duval 		
Hugo Duval

E

Alberto Echagüe 
Eduardo Espinoza
Gabino Ezeiza

F

Néstor Fabián		
Rosanna Falasca		
Ada Falcón 
Adhelma Falcón		
Jorge Falcón (1949–1987)		
Andrés Falgás 
Ernesto Famá 
Chito Faró (Valparaiso, 8 April 1915 – Santiago, 28 April 1986), outstanding composer, actor film and theater, singer and Chilean poet
Héctor Farrel
Néstor Feria	
Guillermo Fernández		
Oscar Ferrari 
Francisco Fiorentino 
Roberto Flores 
Roberto Florio 
Roxana Fontán		
Magalí Fontana		
Roberto Fugazot
Ranko FujisawaJapan.

G

Tita Galatro		
Rodolfo Galé		
Guillermo Galvé		
María Garay		
Carlos Gardel
Armando Garrido
Romeo Gavioli		
Alfredo y Flora Gobbi		
Juan Carlos Godoy
Alberto Gómez 
Roberto Goyeneche 
Juan Carlos Granelli		
María Graña
Adrián Guida

H

Seyyan Hanim (1913–1989), major figure of women's emancipation in Turkey, taking advantage of Atatürk's secularization (and personal protection) to become one of the earliest Muslim women to appear on stage there. Her singing repertoire also included rumba and foxtrot, but tango made her reputation, and she recorded the first Turkish language tango, Necip Celal's Mazi ("The Past") in 1932. She recorded around 50 LPs for HMV and several more for Odeon.
Carlos Heredia

I

Teófilo Ibáñez 
Raúl Iriarte 
Agustín Irusta

J

Rubén Juárez

K

L

Armando Laborde 
Carlos Lafuente
Alberto Lago
Libertad Lamarque 
Juanita Larrauri		
Oscar Larroca 
Patricia Lasala		
Raúl Lavié		
Enrique Lear		
Amanda Ledesma		
Argentino Ledesma 
Susy Leiva		
Rodolfo Lesica		
Pyotr Leshchenko (1898–1954), the "King of Russian Tango" enjoyed great popularity both in Russia and abroad despite being suppressed in the Soviet Union. He sang mainly in Russian, also singing gypsy music. He died in a prison camp near Bucharest.
Claudia Levy		
Mario Luna		
Sandra Luna		
Virginia Luque

M

Mabel Mabel		
Jorge Maciel 
Agustín Magaldi 
Antonio Maida 
Roberto Maida		
Azucena Maizani 
Roberto Mancini		
Amadeo Mandarino		
Juan Carlos Marambio Catán		
Hugo Marcel		
Aníbal Marconi		
Alberto Marino 	
Julio Martel 
Lalo Martel
Reynaldo Martín		
Héctor Mauré 
Orlando Medina		
Ana Medrano		
María José Mentana		
Tita Merello		
Lucrecia Merico
Juan Carlos Miranda		
Nina Miranda 
Rosita Montemar		
Miguel Montero 
María Estela Monti		
Blanca Mooney		
Alberto Morán 	
Roxana Morán		
Victoria Morán		
Carlos Morel
Alberto Moreno
Armando Moreno 
Carlos Moreno		
Osvaldo Moreno		
Pablo Moreno
Daniel Melingo

N

Gustavo Nocetti (1959–2002)		
Silvia Nieves

O

Quique Ojeda		
Sabina Olmos		
Jorge Omar		
Nelly Omar 
Jorge Ortíz 
İbrahim Özgür (1905–1959), dubbed "The King of Turkish Tango" for his singing and composition, after an earlier successful career in jazz. He began tango recordings in 1938. His nostalgic, "velvet" voice was well-suited for his mournful songs, haunted by his unrequited love for an Indian princess he met during his grand tour of Asia in the 1930s. His most famous such song, Mavi Kelebek ("Blue Butterfly"), won him a legion of female fans. Özgür was the first male tango singer to rise to prominence in Turkey, where the tango tradition had been dominated by women.

P

Héctor Pacheco 
Carlos Paiva
Héctor Palacios
Anita Palmero
Ricardo "Chiqui" Pereyra		
Jerzy Petersburski
Alberto Podestá 	
Mario Pomar		
Néstor Prado		
Príncipe Azul

Q

Horacio Quintana 
Roberto Quiroga 
Rosita Quiroga

R

Roberto Ray 
José Razzano		
Néstor Real		
Carlos Reyes		
Tito Reyes 
Gabriel Reynal		
Osvaldo Ribó 
Guillermo Rico 
Susana Rinaldi (1935–), known as "la passionaria du tango", is also an actress. To avoid military rule, she settled in France where she has enjoyed a successful career. A UNESCO Goodwill Ambassador and social justice campaigner, she has been active in the artists' rights movement.
Marcela Ríos		
Alberto Rivas
Osvaldo Ramos
Pablo Ramos
Elsa Rivas 
Osvaldo Rivas		
Edmundo Rivero 
Zulema Robles		
Antonio Rodríguez Lesende		
Néstor Rolán		
Carlos Roldán 
Roberto Rufino 
Floreal Ruiz 
Ricardo Ruiz

S

Carlos Saavedra
Alfredo Sáez		
Mario Saladino		
Hernán Salinas		
Oscar Serpa 
Mercedes Simone 
Jorge Sobral		
Alba Solís		
Diego Solís		
Julio Sosa  (1926–1964), from Uruguay; was one of the most important tango singers during tango's unhappy years in the 1950s and early 1960s. His passion for poetry led to his sole published book; his passion for fast cars led to his young death.
Hrysoula Stefanaki popular Greek singer / vocalist, and musician, born in Heraklion, Crete, Greece, best known for her outstanding & unique performances on national & international retro songs such as "Tango Noturno", "Blue Haven", "The last waltz", "Regretting for wasted years"etc.

T

Giovanna Tango
Tania
Linda Thelma
Juan Carlos Thorry

U

V

Jorge Valdez 		
Enzo Valentino		
Adriana Varela		
Carlos Varela
Angel Vargas 
Nelly Vázquez		
Leopoldo Díaz Vélez
Virginia Vera		
Virginia Verónica		
Orlando Verri		
Carlos Vidal		
Jorge Vidal 
Alberto Vila
Ángel Villoldo
Olavi Virta Finland.	
Carlos Viván		
María Volonté

W

X

Y

Walter Yonsky

Z

Julia Zenko

Source lists

     ti    This person appears on this list of notable tango singers, tango.info (URL accessed 2006-09-19).

     TT    This person appears in todotango.com (URL accessed 12 July 2006).

Individual references

Tango
 
Tango